The following is the discography of American R&B group Dru Hill.

Albums

Studio albums

Compilation albums

Live albums

EPs

Singles

As a lead artist

Note
Did not chart on Hot R&B/Hip-Hop Songs chart (Billboard rules at the time prevented album cuts from charting). Chart peak listed represents the Hot R&B/Hip-Hop Airplay chart.

Featured singles

Guest appearances

Soundtrack appearances

Music videos

Home videos

References

Dru Hill
Discographies of American artists
Rhythm and blues discographies
Soul music discographies